The John Gibson Gallery was a contemporary art gallery in New York City, in operation from November 1967 to 2000, and founded by . Early on, the gallery specialized in selling contemporary monumental–sized sculptures.

History

Precursor 

The Park Place Gallery in New York became a center of attention for the downtown art scene and their original gallery members were all of the cutting edge. John Gibson was the first director of Park Place Gallery from 1963 to 1965. By 1966, the SoHo neighborhood of New York City had a growing artist community, and had revolutionized what was possible for young artists.

John Gibson Gallery 
John Gibson later opened his own gallery in 1967, in the neighborhood of Lenox Hill. Gibson was aided in running the John Gibson Gallery by his wife, Susan Gibson. The John Gibson Gallery held its first group exhibition on November 1967, The Hanging, Floating, Cantilever Show. The first exhibition featured installation art by Donald Judd, Andy Warhol, Kenneth Snelson, Christo, Robert Morris, Forrest Myers, and Sol LeWitt. By 1972, the gallery moved locations to 392 West Broadway in Soho.

John Gibson Gallery closed in 2000, and Gibson died on March 1, 2019. The John Gibson Gallery has work in public collections such as the Harvard Art Museums.

Artists 
The gallery is primarily known for the Minimalist, land art, arte povera, conceptual artists and European artists it has represented and whose careers it helped launch.

Gallery locations 
1967–1971, John Gibson Gallery, Projects for Commissions, 27 East 67th Street, New York City, New York, 10021
1972–1980, John Gibson Gallery, 392 West Broadway, New York City, New York, 10012
1981–1984, John Gibson Gallery, 205 East 78th Street, New York City, New York, 10021
1984–2000, John Gibson Gallery, 568 Broadway at Prince, New York City, New York, 10012

Art fairs 
Art Basel (1972, 1975, 1976, 1978, 1979, 1987, 1988, 1989, 1990, 1991),
Art Cologne (1974, 1975)

Notes

External links 
Interview with John Gibson, from Archives of American Art, Smithsonian Institution
John Gibson Gallery on ArtFactsNet

Defunct art museums and galleries in New York City
Art galleries established in 1967
Art galleries disestablished in 2000
Defunct art museums and galleries in Manhattan